The Shropshire Pastoral Region is a deanery located in the Roman Catholic Diocese of Shrewsbury.

Its current bishop is Brian Noble.

It is sub-divided into five pastoral areas, which in turn contain 19 parishes.

Shropshire Pastoral Region 

Prior to October 2007, two deaneries - Shrewsbury & West Shropshire and Telford & East Shropshire - existed.  In line with diocesan restructuring by Bishop Brian Noble, these were merged to form the Shropshire Pastoral Area.

The deanery comprises the whole of Shropshire.

Regional Dean: Canon Stephan Coonan

References

External links
Diocese Website
Catholic Hierarchy - Diocese Information
Diocese Vocation Office
GCatholic.org

Religion in Shropshire
Roman Catholic Deaneries in the Diocese of Shrewsbury
Roman Catholic Diocese of Shrewsbury